Dan Barry is a longtime reporter and columnist for The New York Times. He is the author of five books, including This Land: America, Lost and Found, a collection of his national columns for The Times that was published in 2018.

Biography 
Barry, whose father was from Brooklyn and whose mother was from County Galway, Ireland, was born in Queens, N.Y., and raised in Deer Park, N.Y. He graduated from St. Anthony's High School (now in Huntington, N.Y.) in 1976, when it was an all-boys high school in Smithtown, N.Y. His experiences at St. Anthony's figure in his memoir, Pull Me Up. He graduated from St. Bonaventure University in 1980 with a bachelor's degree in mass communications and received  a master's degree in journalism from New York University.

In 1983, after years working as a delicatessen clerk and ditch digger, Barry joined The Journal Inquirer in Manchester, Conn., as a reporter, and moved to the Providence Journal-Bulletin in 1987. In 1992, he won a shared Polk Award for investigating the causes of a state banking crisis. In 1994, he was part of a Journal-Bulletin investigative team that won the Pulitzer Prize for Investigative Reporting after exposing corruption in the Rhode Island court system.

Barry joined The New York Times in 1995. He served as Long Island bureau chief, police bureau chief, City Hall bureau chief, and general assignment reporter for the Metropolitan desk before resurrecting  the "About New York column" in 2003. Then, in 2007, he began the "This Land" column, which took him to all 50 states over the course of a decade. He now specializes in long-form narratives.

His writing also appears in several non-fiction anthologies.

Personal life 
Barry lives in Maplewood, NJ, with his wife, Mary Trinity, and two daughters, Nora and Grace.

Awards 
 1994 Pulitzer Prize for Investigative Reporting for exposing corruption in the Rhode Island court system
 Pulitzer finalist in 2006, for his coverage of post-Hurricane Katrina New Orleans and life in New York City
 Pulitzer finalist in 2010, for his coverage of how the Great Recession changed lives and relationships in America 
 1992 shared Polk Award for investigating the causes of a state banking crisis
 2003 American Society of Newspaper Editors Award for deadline reporting, for his coverage of the first anniversary of Sept. 11
 the 2005 Mike Berger Award, which honors in-depth human interest reporting
 the 2010 Sigma Delta Chi Award for column writing from the Society for Professional Journalists
 2015 Best American Newspaper Narrative award
 In May 2016, Barry was given an honorary doctorate by his alma mater, St. Bonaventure University, after which he delivered the commencement address for the graduating class of 2016.
 In 2018, Barry was named recipient of the Story in the Public Square, awarded by the Pell Center for International Relations and Public Policy

Bibliography 
·      Pull Me Up (2004) — memoir of Barry's Long Island Irish Catholic upbringing and battle with cancer

·      City Lights: Stories About New York (2007) — collection of Barry's "About New York" columns

·      Bottom of the 33rd: Hope, Redemption, and Baseball’s Longest Game (HarperCollins, 2011; paperback March 2012) — about the longest game in professional baseball history

·      The Boys in the Bunkhouse: Servitude and Salvation in the Heartland (HarperCollins, 2016) – about the exploitation of a group of Texas men with intellectual disability who worked for decades in a turkey-processing plant in eastern Iowa

·      This Land: America, Lost and Found (Black Dog & Leventhal, 2018) – a collection of Barry's national "This Land" columns.

References

External links
Barry bio on the New York Times website
Barry's New York Times columns

People from Deer Park, New York
People from Maplewood, New Jersey
St. Bonaventure University alumni
New York University alumni
1950s births
Living people
The New York Times Pulitzer Prize winners
The New York Times columnists
The Providence Journal people
20th-century American journalists
American male journalists